James "Jim"/"Jimmy" J. Featherstone (25 February 1923 – 6 May 2014) was an English professional rugby league footballer who played in the 1940s and 1950s.

Background
Jim Featherstone's birth was registered in Wigan district, Lancashire, England, he worked as a coal miner, steam locomotive stoker (including for the Flying Scotsman), and he died aged 91 in Wigan, Greater Manchester, England.

Playing career

International honours
Jim Featherstone won caps for England while at Warrington in 1948 against France, in 1949 against Wales, France (2 matches), and Other Nationalities, in 1950 against Wales (2 matches), in 1952 against Wales, and won caps for Great Britain while at Warrington in 1948 against Australia, on the 1950 Great Britain Lions tour against New Zealand (2 matches), and in 1952 against Australia (3 matches).

Championship final appearances
Jim Featherstone played left-, i.e. number 11, and scored a try in Wigan's 13–9 victory over Dewsbury in the Championship Final first-leg during the 1943–44 season at Central Park, Wigan on Saturday 13 May 1944, played left- in the 12–5 victory over Dewsbury in the Championship Final second-leg during the 1943–44 season at Crown Flatt, Dewsbury on Saturday 20 May 1944. and played left- in Warrington's 15–5 victory over Bradford Northern in the Championship Final during the 1947–48 season at Maine Road, Manchester.

County Cup Final appearances
Jim Featherstone played left-, i.e. number 11, in Warrington's 8–14 defeat by Wigan in the 1948–49 Lancashire County Cup Final during the 1948–49 season at Station Road, Swinton on Saturday 13 November 1948, and played right-, i.e. number 10, in the 5–28 defeat by Wigan in the 1950–51 Lancashire County Cup Final during the 1949–50 season at Station Road, Swinton on Saturday 4 November 1950.

Club career
Jim Featherstone made his début for Wigan in the 19–11 victory over Hunslet at Parkside, Hunslet on Saturday 20 November 1943, 
he scored his first try for Wigan in the 3–0 victory over Bradford Northern in the 1943–44 Challenge Cup Final 1st Leg at Central Park, Wigan on Thursday 15 April 1943, he scored his last try for Wigan (in his second spell) in the 29–2 victory over Swinton at Central Park, Wigan on Saturday 5 March 1955, he played his last match for Wigan (in his second spell) in the 6–13 defeat by Featherstone Rovers at Post Office Road, Featherstone on Saturday 17 September 1955, he made his début for Warrington on Saturday 5 January 1946, and he played his last match for Warrington on Saturday 21 February 1953.

Honoured at Warrington Wolves
Jim Featherstone is a Warrington Wolves Hall of Fame inductee.

Genealogical information
Jim Featherstone's marriage to Lillian M. (née Malley) was registered during third ¼ 1949 in Ince district. They had children; Ian J. Featherstone (birth registered during second ¼  in Ince district). Lillian M. Featherstone died , when Ian J. Featherstone was 5 years old. Jim Featherstone remarried, his marriage to Elizabeth (née Robinson) was registered during third ¼ 1957 in Ince district, she would be his wife for the next 56 years.

References

External links
Statistics at wolvesplayers.thisiswarrington.co.uk

1923 births
2014 deaths
Broughton Rangers players
England national rugby league team players
English rugby league players
Great Britain national rugby league team players
Lancashire rugby league team players
Rochdale Hornets players
Rugby league locks
Rugby league props
Rugby league second-rows
Rugby league players from Wigan
Warrington Wolves players
Wigan Warriors players